is the 20th single by Japanese idol girl group Nogizaka46. It was released on 25 April 2018. It reached number one on the weekly Oricon Singles Chart with 1,117,000 copies sold. It was also number one on the Billboard Japan Hot 100. The song won the Grand Prix at the 60th Japan Record Awards, giving the group their second win in a row.

Release 
This single was released in five versions. Type-A, Type-B, Type-C, Type-D and a regular edition.

Track listing
All lyrics written by Yasushi Akimoto.

Type-A

Type-B

Type-C

Type-D

Regular Edition

Participating members

"Synchronicity" 
Center: Mai Shiraishi

3rd Row: Sayuri Inoue, Mai Shinuchi, Kazumi Takayama, Minami Hoshino, Yumi Wakatsuki, Hina Higuchi, Ranze Terada

2nd Row: Reika Sakurai, Sayuri Matsumura, Shiori Kubo, Rina Ikoma, Momoko Ōzono, Misa Etō, Manatsu Akimoto

1st Row: Mizuki Yamashita, Miona Hori, Erika Ikuta, Mai Shiraishi , Nanase Nishino, Asuka Saitō, Yūki Yoda

Against

Centre: Rina Ikoma 

1st Generation: Manatsu Akimoto, Erika Ikuta, Rina Ikoma, Sayuri Inoue, Misa Etō, Hina Kawago, Asuka Saitō, Chiharu Saitō, Yūri Saitō, Reika Sakurai, Mai Shiraishi, Kazumi Takayama, Kana Nakada, Nanase Nishino, Ami Noujo, Hina Higuchi, Minami Hoshino, Sayuri Matsumura, Yumi Wakatsuki, Maaya Wada

Kumo ni Nareba ii

Donworii: Erika Ikuta, Misa Etō, Reika Sakurai

Atarashii Sekai

Under Members

Centre: Ayane Suzuki

1st Generation: Hina Kawago, Chiharu Saitō, Yūri Saitō, Kana Nakada, Ami Noujo, Maaya Wada

2nd Generation: Karin Itō, Junna Itō, Iori Sagara, Kotoko Sasaki, Ayane Suzuki, Rena Yamazaki, Miria Watanabe

3rd Generation: Riria Itō, Renka Iwamoto, Minami Umezawa, Tamami Sakaguchi, Kaede Satō, Reno Nakamura, Hazuki Mukai, Ayano Christie Yoshida

Scout Man

Centre: Miona Hori

2nd Generation: Karin Itō, Junna Itō, Iori Sagara, Kotoko Sasaki, Mai Shinuchi, Ayane Suzuki, Ranze Terada, Miona Hori, Rena Yamazaki, Miria Watanabe

Toki Toki Meki Meki

Centre: Renka Iwamoto

3rd Generation: Riria Itō, Renka Iwamoto, Minami Umezawa, Momoko Ōzono, Shiori Kubo, Tamami Sakaguchi, Kaede Satō, Reno Nakamura, Hazuki Mukai, Mizuki Yamashita, Ayano Christie Yoshida, Yūki Yoda

Kotodomaho

Imoutozaka: Momoko Ōzono, Shiori Kubo, Mizuki Yamashita, Yūki Yoda

Chart performance

Oricon

Billboard Japan

References

2018 singles
2018 songs
Japanese-language songs
Nogizaka46 songs
Oricon Weekly number-one singles
Billboard Japan Hot 100 number-one singles
Song articles with missing songwriters
Songs with lyrics by Yasushi Akimoto